Passing Strange is a 2006 rock musical by Stew. An adaptation filmed by Spike Lee was shown at the 2009 Sundance Film Festival.

Passing Strange may also refer to:
 Passing Strange, a 1980 novel by Catherine Aird
 Passing Strange (novella), a 2017 novella by Ellen Klages
 Passing Strange: True Tales of New England Hauntings and Horrors, a book by folklorist Joseph A. Citro

See also
 Passing Stranger (disambiguation)